Only You may refer to:

Film and television

Film
 Only You (1992 film), an American comedy directed by Betty Thomas
 Only You (1994 film), an American romantic comedy directed by Norman Jewison
 Only You (2011 film) or Always, a South Korean drama directed by Song Il-gon 
 Only You (2015 film), a Chinese romantic comedy directed by Zhang Hao
 Only You (2018 film), a British romantic drama directed by Harry Wootliff
Abo So ("Only You"), 2013 Aruban film

Television
 Only You (2002 TV series), a Chinese drama series
 Only You (2005 TV series), a Korean drama series
 Only You (2009 TV series), a Philippine remake of the Korean series
 Only You (2011 TV series), a Hong Kong drama series
 "Only You" (The Americans), a 2013 episode
 "Only You" (Once Upon a Time), a 2016 episode

Music
Only You (singer), Weng Li-you (born 1975), Taiwanese pop singer

Albums
 Only You (Harry Connick, Jr. album), 2004
 Only You (Karyn Williams album), 2012
 Only You (EP) by ShineBright, 2015
 Only You, by David Choi, 2008

Songs
 "Only You (And You Alone)", by the Platters, 1954; covered by the Hilltoppers (1955), Franck Pourcel (1959), Ringo Starr (1974), and others
 "Only You (Can Break My Heart)", by Buck Owens, 1965
 "Only You" (Cee Lo Green song), 2013
 "Only You" (Cheat Codes and Little Mix song), 2018
 "Only You" (Gims song), 2021
 "Only You" (Josh Kelley song), 2005
 "Only You" (Morning Musume song), 2011
 "Only You" (Nikki Laoye song), 2013
 "Only You" (Portishead song), 1998
 "Only You" (Starlight Express), from the musical Starlight Express, 1984
 "Only You" (Teddy Pendergrass song), 1978
 "Only You" (Viktoria Modesta song), 2012
 "Only You" (Yazoo song), 1982; covered by the Flying Pickets (1983), Enrique Iglesias (1997), Kylie Minogue (2015), and others
 "Only You" (Zara Larsson song), 2017
 "Only You" (112 song), 1996
 "Only U", by Ashanti, 2004
 "Only You", by Alicia Keys from Keys, 2021
 "Only You", by Ayọ from Joyful, 2006
 "Only You", by Captain Jack, 1999
 "Only You", by Chicago from Chicago 17, 1984
 "Only You", by Ellie Goulding from Halcyon Days, 2013
 "Only You", by Fleetwood Mac from Live in Boston, 1985
 "Only You", by Kiss from Music from "The Elder", 1981
 "Only You", by Lasgo from Far Away, 2005
 "Only You", by Markus Feehily from Fire, 2015
 "Only You", by Martha and the Muffins from The World Is a Ball, 1986
 "Only You", by Metro Boomin from Not All Heroes Wear Capes, 2018
 "Only You", by Miss A from Colors, 2015
 "Only You", by Neil Diamond from On the Way to the Sky, 1981
 "Only You", by Praise, 1991
 "Only You", by the Pretty Reckless from Frankenweenie Unleashed!, 2012
 "Only You", by Rain from Rainism, 2008
 "Only You", by Roberto Zanetti (Savage), 1984
 "Only You", by Sarah Close, 2017
 "Only You", by Saturday, 2021
 "Only You", by Scatman John from Scatman's World, 1995
 "Only You", by Sofia Rotaru from Sofia Rotaru, 1972
 "Only You", by Taio Cruz from Rokstarr, 2009
 "Only You", by Sugababes from The Lost Tapes, 2022
 "Only You", by Toto from Kingdom of Desire, 1992
 "Only You", by the Wanted from Word of Mouth, 2013
 "Only U", by VIXX from Voodoo, 2013

See also
 Solamente Tú (disambiguation)

English phrases